Cynoglossus gilchristi, commonly known as the ripplefin tongue sole is a species of tonguefish. It is commonly found in the western Indian Ocean off Delagoa Bay, Mozambique, South Africa, and Madagascar.

References
Fishbase

Cynoglossidae
Fish described in 1920